Sun Wei (born 11 September 1976) is a Chinese baseball player who was a member of Team China at the 2008 Summer Olympics.

Sports career
1994 Beijing Municipal Team;
1995 National Team

Major performances
1997 National Games - 1st;
2003-2005 National League - 1st

References
Profile 2008 Olympics Team China

1976 births
Living people
Baseball players at the 2008 Summer Olympics
Chinese baseball players
Olympic baseball players of China
Baseball players from Beijing
Baseball players at the 1998 Asian Games
Baseball players at the 2002 Asian Games
Baseball players at the 2006 Asian Games
Asian Games competitors for China